Arisaema fimbriatum is a species of Arisaema found in Thailand, Peninsular Malaysia, and Pulau Lankawi

Taxonomy
A. fimbriata is the type species for Arisaema section Fimbriata  a section with  subglobose tubers and trifoliate leaves, bisexual spadix and a long spadix appendage that extends from the spathe. Plants in this section are from subtropical Asia. This section was first described in 1979, comprising six species. It was later synonymised under section Attenuata by Murata in 2011. In 2016 Ohi-Toma et al. reserected the section as monotypic with A. fimbriata following a phylogenetic analysis of the genus.

References

External links

fimbriatum
Flora of Thailand
Flora of Peninsular Malaysia